Janus Kostia Putkonen (born 16 January 1974 in Pernå) is a Finnish theater director and journalist. Putkonen was the editor-in-chief of the Verkkomedia website, which was active from 2011–2013. From 2015 to 2018, he was the director of the Russian-backed Donetsk Separatist Information Center Doni-News. Since 2019, he has been the editor-in-chief of MV-media. Putkonen focused Russian funded Doni-news and MV-media to support pro-Russian propaganda about the Donetsk People's Republic.

Life
In 1994 Putkonen participated on 's Tähtimannekiini modeling contest and won. Next year he was the press favorite of Mr. Finland -competition, but didn't place in the prize positions. 

In 2009 Putkonen moved to the city of Nakhon Sawan in Thailand, with his family. He started to work on his Verkkomedia fake news outlet on 2011, it was operated from his home office.

Kilvenmaa collective project that was founded by Janus Putkonen in 2013 in the city of Alajärvi. It was supposedly an anti-capitalist commune based on conspiracy theories of society. It's story ended when Putkonen escaped his debts to Thailand. Afterwards participants revealed that all they did was smoked marijuana and posted disinformation on the Internet on topics decided by Putkonen.

Putkonen participated in the 2014 European Parliament election as a candidate of Itsenäisyyspuolue political party. He got a total of 962 votes and wasn't elected.

In summer of 2015 Putkonen moved from Nakhon Sawan to Donetsk, while his wife and child stayed in Thailand. Soon Ukrainian non-governmental organization Myrotvorets added Putkonen to their ‘Peacemaker’ list, on suspicion of cooperating with Russia and propaganda against Ukraine.

In September 2016, Putkonen went public on offering Ilja Janitskin political asylum in the Donetsk People's Republic. Putkonen also appeared on leaked mail dump known as Egorova Leaks. Tatiana Egorova was an employee of "DPR Ministry of Information".

In 2017, Putkonen appeared on an episode of Viceland’s Big Night Out Ukraine. In it, Putkonen explains that he hopes Novorossiya will show an example of insurgence to other countries.

In October 2022, Putkonen organized a friendship tour, from Finland to Russia's St. Petersburg, with help from Kosti Heiskanen. This was branded as a trip organized by Fennomatkat, which is thought to be a subsidiary brand of Fennomaa. According to both Putkonen and Heiskanen they got help with travel documents from Rustravel Oy. These kinds of friendship tours are echoes from the era of Soviet Union. In Finland, there was even a company named Friendship Tours Ltd. It was founded in 1977 and went bankrupt in 1991.

Putkonen has been involved in recruiting Finns for the war in eastern Ukraine on the Russian side.

Putkonen is the editor-in-chief of the Finnish fake news outlet MV-media starting April 2019.

Personal life
Putkonen's parents are opera singer Marko Putkonen and theater director Tuovi Putkonen. He has two sisters, horse farm owner Esma Haddas and actress Krista Putkonen-Örn. And a wife and one child, name Anayan.

References 

Living people
1974 births
People of the Donetsk People's Republic
Finnish theatre directors
Russophilia